Atomic Heart is the fourth studio album by Japanese rock band Mr. Children, released in September 1994. The album features two successful lead singles "Cross Road" and "Innocent World".

Background
In November 1993, the band released their fourth single "Cross Road". It provided the band with their first top-10 hit (peaked at #6) on the Japanese Oricon singles chart, and remained on the chart for about one year. Success of a single brought the band into prominence by 1994. Their follow-up single "Innocent World", which was featured in the TV advertisement for Coca-Cola's sports drink Aquarius, came out in June 1994 and immediately went straight to the top on the chart. It stayed 2 weeks at #1 and remained the chart for 41 weeks, selling over 1.9 million copies and becoming that year's top-selling single in Japan. Popularity of the band had soared before the album was released.

Reception
Stimulated by those smash hit singles, Atomic Heart debuted at #1 on the Japanese albums chart with first-week sales of over 852,000 copies. On the 1994 year-end charts published by the Oricon, it is ranked at the third best-selling album of that year with sales of 1.7 million copies. It continuously sold well in the following year, selling further 1.5 million units and reaching number-six on that year's top-selling list. The album eventually spent 96 weeks on the Oricon top-100, with cumulative sales of over 3.4 million copies during its chart run. In November 1995, the album was certified triple million by the Recording Industry Association of Japan, for shipments of over 3 million units. Atomic Heart was once the top-selling album in Japan, until outsold by Globe's eponymous first album in 1996.

Along with its lead single "Innocent World", Atomic Heart won the 36th Japan Record Awards on New Year's Eve of 1994. The artist, who had flown to Australia for preparation of their forthcoming concert tour, did not attend the ceremony. There was a convention that the award's winners had been supposed to attend the ceremony absolutely, therefore their absence caused little controversy.

Track listing

Personnel 
 Kazutoshi Sakurai – vocals, guitar
 Kenichi Tahara – guitar
 Keisuke Nakagawa – bass
 Hideya Suzuki – drums
 Takuo Yamamoto - alto, soprano, tenor sax
 Toshio Araki - trumpet, flugelhorn
 Hirokazu Ogura - bouzouki, electric guitar
 Tomoko - chorus

Production 
Production credits for album:

 Producer - Takeshi Kobayashi
 Arrangement - Mr. Children and Takeshi Kobyashi
 Executive producer - Takamitsu Ide, Akira Yasukawa
 Co-producer - Hiroshi Hiranuma
 Recording - Hiroshi Hiranuma
 Mixing - Hiroshi Hiranuma
 A&R - Koichi Inaba
 Director - Katsumi Shinohara
 Computer programming - Rentaro Takayasu, Yoshinori Kadoya, and Ken Matsumoto
 Assistant engineering - Yoshiki Fukushima, Shigeki Kashii, Kezo Awano, Naoaki Nemoto, and Takeshi Okano
 Recorded at - Tokyufun, Tokyo Hilton Hotel, Oorong-soh, Sound Village Studio, Victor Yamanakako Studio, Free Studio Tsukiji, and Baybridge Studio
 Mixed at - Tokyufun, Free Stuio Tsukiji
 Mastering - Sterling Studio NY
 Mastered by - George Marino
 U.S production supervision - Ami Matsumura
 Public Relations - Masayuki Nakagawa
 Promotion staff - Tomohiro Okada, Tetsuya Yamamura, Michiharu Sato, Junichi Ashikawa
 Art Direction - Mitsuo Shindo
 Designer - Ryoji Ohya
 Photographer - Itaru Hirama
 Stylist - Hiroko Umeyama
 Hair and make-up - Miyuki Watanabe

Charts

Weekly charts

Year-end charts

All-time chart

Certifications

References 

1994 albums
Mr. Children albums
Albums produced by Takeshi Kobayashi
Japanese-language albums